The wrinkle-lipped free-tailed bat (Chaerephon plicatus) is a species of bat in the family Molossidae.
It is found in Bangladesh, Bhutan, Cambodia, China, Cocos (Keeling) Islands, India, Indonesia, Laos, Malaysia, Myanmar, Nepal, the Philippines, Sri Lanka, Thailand and Vietnam.

Taxonomy and etymology

It was described as a new species in 1800 by Scottish scientist Francis Buchanan-Hamilton. Buchanan-Hamilton initially placed it into the genus Vespertilio, with the scientific name Vespertilio plicatus. Its species name "plicatus" is Latin for "folded," possibly referencing its wrinkled lips or its folded ears.

Description
Its fur is dark brown.

Range and habitat
Its range includes several countries and regions in South and Southeast Asia, including Cambodia, China, Hong Kong, India, Laos, Malaysia, Philippines, Sri Lanka, and Vietnam.

Conservation
As of 2020, it is evaluated as a least-concern species by the IUCN—its lowest conservation priority. It met the criteria for this classification because it has a wide geographic range; its range includes protected areas, its population size is large; and it is unlikely to be experiencing rapid population decline. However, some local populations may be threatened by overharvesting for bushmeat, habitat loss via deforestation, cave disturbance, and persecution of its roosts due to the perception that it is a pest. Examples of such human interference include in northern Myanmar as a result of limestone extraction for cement manufacture and colony of hundreds of thousands of bats eradicated "as pests" in Phnom Pehn.

See also
List of mammals in Hong Kong

References

External links

Article about the species (University of Bristol)
Information about the species in Thailand (Thai National Parks)

Chaerephon (bat)
Bats of Asia
Bats of South Asia
Bats of Southeast Asia
Bats of India
Bats of Indonesia
Bats of Malaysia
Mammals of Bangladesh
Mammals of Bhutan
Mammals of Cambodia
Mammals of China
Mammals of Laos
Mammals of Nepal
Mammals of the Philippines
Mammals of Sri Lanka
Mammals of Thailand
Mammals of Vietnam
Least concern biota of Asia
Mammals described in 1800
Taxa named by Francis Buchanan-Hamilton
Taxonomy articles created by Polbot